James Gennaro is an American politician serving as a Democratic member of the New York City Council, representing the 24th district since 2021. He previously represented the same seat from 2002 until 2013, and was the chair of the Council's Environmental Protection Committee. He was first elected to the Council in 2001. In November 2005, he was re-elected to the seat, based in central Queens.

In the 2008 New York state elections, Gennaro was the Democratic candidate for the New York State Senate; his opponent was the Republican incumbent, Frank Padavan. After 3 months of recounting ballots, the incumbent, Senator Padavan, was declared the winner and Gennaro conceded defeat.

In November 2009, Gennaro was re-elected for a third term on the City Council. Due to term limits, Gennaro did not run again in 2013; his seat was won by Democrat Rory Lancman. Gennaro left office on December 31, 2013.

Formerly the senior policy adviser to then Council Speaker Peter Vallone, Sr., Gennaro was an adjunct professor of political science and environmental public policy at Queens College. He also served as President of the Jamaica Estates Association and as a member of Queens Community Board 8.

Gennaro lost his first wife Joanne to multiple system atrophy in 2016. He married his second wife, Wendy B. Phaff in 2020, and they live in Jamaica Estates, Queens.

In 2020, he declared his intention to run for his former Council seat. 
On February 2, 2021, Gennaro declared his victory in the nonpartisan special election for this seat, after the city's Board of Election released its in-person voting results for that day. The election was the first in New York City to use ranked choice voting. Gennaro was sworn into office on February 18, 2021, 16 days after the special election date.

References

Living people
New York City Council members
New York (state) Democrats
People from Jamaica Estates, Queens
American people of Italian descent
Stony Brook University alumni
1957 births